Mario Francisco Fortunato (1904 – 10 January 1970) was an Argentine football player and manager. Fortunato won three championships as a player with Boca Juniors and went on to lead the club to four Primera División and twp domestic cups as manager.

Playing career

Club
Fortunato began playing for Boca Juniors in 1925, he made his debut on 1 September in a 2–0 win against Palermo. He played for the club until 1926, winning three titles in those years: Copa de Competencia Jockey Club (1925), Primera División (1926) and Copa Estímulo (also in 1926).

In 1927 he joined Huracán where he played until 1929. He returned to Boca and played 3 more games for the club in September and October 1929.

Fortunato retired early due to a knee injury, but continued to play in the Argentine amateur league with Sportivo Barracas in the 1932 season.

National team
Fortunato played 11 games for Argentina, making his debut in a 2–0 win against Paraguay on 29 November 1925. He was part of the squad for the 1926 South American Championship (current "Copa América") where Argentina finished as runners up.

Managerial career
Fortunato became manager of Boca Juniors in 1930 at the age of 26. He led the team to four league titles in 1930, 1931, 1934 and 1935. He returned to the club in 1946 and 1956 and amassed 351 games in charge of the club. Of these games he won 226, drew 57 and lost 68.

Fortunato also served as the manager of Ferro Carril Oeste, Racing, Chacarita Juniors, Botafogo of Brazil, Rosario Central and Estudiantes de La Plata. In 1950 he led Club Atlético Lanús to the second division championship.

Honours

Player
Boca Juniors
 Primera División (1): 1926
 Copa de Competencia Jockey Club (1): 1925
 Copa Ibarguren (1): 1924 

Notes

Manager
Boca Juniors
 Argentine Primera División (4): 1930, 1931, 1934, 1935
 Copa de Competencia Británica (1): 1946
 Copa Escobar-Gerona (1): 1946
Lanús
 Segunda División (1): 1950

References

External links

 Profile at Informe Xeneize 
 Boca Juniors playing statistics 
 Boca Juniors managerial statistics 

Argentine footballers
Argentina international footballers
Argentine people of Italian descent
Association football midfielders
Boca Juniors footballers
Club Atlético Huracán footballers
Argentine football managers
Boca Juniors managers
Ferro Carril Oeste managers
Racing Club de Avellaneda managers
Chacarita Juniors managers
Rosario Central managers
Club Atlético Lanús managers
Estudiantes de La Plata managers
Botafogo de Futebol e Regatas managers
Argentine Primera División players
1900s births
1970 deaths